Catherine Price  may refer to:
Character in The Mole (American season 1)
Katherine E. Price
Kate Price (musician)
Kate Price (actress)
Cathy J. Price, British neuroscientist